Kusoty (Khüsööte) is a rural locality (an ulus) in Mukhorshibirsky District, Republic of Buryatia, Russia. The population was 703 as of 2010. There are 15 streets.

Geography 
Kusoty is located 80 km northeast of Mukhorshibir (the district's administrative centre) by road. Sagan-Nur is the nearest rural locality.

References 

Rural localities in Mukhorshibirsky District